The Barbours Creek-Shawvers Run Cluster is a region in the Jefferson National Forest recognized by The Wilderness Society for its unique high elevation mountains, vistas, trout streams and wildlife habitat. With over 25,000 acres in a remote corner of the national forest, the cluster provides protection for black bear, clean water, backcountry hiking, and scenic beauty.

Description
The Barbours Creek/Shawvers Run Wilderness Cluster contains wilderness areas, and wildlands recognized by the Wilderness Society as "Mountain Treasures", areas that are worthy of protection from logging and road construction.

The areas in the cluster are:
Wilderness Areas
Barbours Creek Wilderness
Shawvers Run Wilderness
wild areas in the Jefferson National Forest recognized by the Wilderness Society as "Mountain Treasures"
Hoop hole
Barbours Creek Wilderness Addition
Potts Arm
Toms Knob, a wild area in the George Washington National Forest recognized by the Wilderness Society as a "Mountain Treasure".

Location and access
 
The cluster is about six miles north of New Castle.   Roads and trails are given on National Geographic Maps 788 (Covington, Alleghany Highlands).  A great variety of information, including topographic maps, aerial views, satellite data and weather information, is obtained by selecting the link with the wild land's coordinates  in the upper right of this page.

Biological significance
The land form, climate, soils and geology of the Appalachian highlands, as well as its evolutionary history, have created one of the most diverse collection of plants and animals in the deciduous forests of the temperate world.

At one time the American chestnut was a dominant part of the forest, but it was almost eliminated during the first three decades of the twentieth century by a chestnut blight fungus.  Now the area is dominated by different species of oak.

Geologic history
Extending along the western boundary of Virginia, the Ridge and Valley province is composed of long,  relatively level-crested, ridges with highest elevations reaching over 3600 feet. The province marks the eastern boundary in the Paleozoic era of an older land surface on the east.  It was uplifted and eroded during the Paleozoic with extensive folding and thrust-faulting.  Resistant quartzite, conglomerates and sandstones form the ridge caps while less resistant shales and limestones eroded to form the intervening valleys.

The area is part of the James River drainage.  Shawvers Run is a tributary of Potts Creek, which flows into the James River.  Barbours Creek flows into Craig Creek, a tributary of the James River.

Toms Knob
Toms Knob is a wild area that extends into both the James River District of the George Washington National Forest and the Eastern Divide District of the Jefferson National Forest.  A review by the wilderness society of areas in the George Washington National Forest  recognized the area as a "Mountain Treasure".  
Named after a series of rock outcrops on the crest of  Potts Mountain, the knob offers good views of the Potts Creek Valley and Peters Mountain on the west.  The Potts Mountain Jeep Road, running along the crest of Potts Mountain, separates the area from the Barbours Creek Wilderness.  The highest elevation is about 3800 feet on the crest of Potts Mountain; the lowest elevation is 1750 feet in Shanty Hollow on the northeast corner of the area.

The area includes a small Special Biological Area on the crest of the ridge, as well as small areas of potential old-growth trees.

There are a few short trails in the Shanty Hollow area, in the northeastern tip of the area. Trails include:
Children's Forest, Forest Service Trail 626, 0.3 miles
Children's Forest Long Loop, FS Trail 627, 2.6 miles
Children's Forest Horse, FS Trail 628, 3.3 miles

Black bear

The cluster's large area provides essential habitat for the black bear  population, an umbrella species contributing to the biological diversity of the Appalachians.

The area gives bear a refuge from human activities, and the availability of critical food in the form of acorns from oaks, as well as spring and summer foods such as blueberries, blackberries, pokeweed and huckleberries. Bears require space for escape cover and winter dens.  Without the forest lands in the Appalachians, the black bear population would be threatened.

Steel Bridge Recreation Area
The recreation area, on Potts Creek, is at the north end of Shawvers Run Wilderness.  Visitors on hot summer days can wade in the cold water of Potts Creek or enjoy fishing in pools beneath rock overhangs along the banks of Potts Creek.  There are 20 primitive campsites with tables, fireplaces, hand-pumped water and pit toilets. The area is open year-around.

See also
Unprotected Wildlands in the George Washington National Forest

Other clusters
Other clusters of the Wilderness Society's "Mountain Treasures" in the Jefferson National Forest (north to south):

Glenwood Cluster
Craig Creek Cluster
Sinking Creek Valley Cluster
Mountain Lake Wilderness Cluster
Angels Rest Cluster
Walker Mountain Cluster
Kimberling Creek Cluster
Garden Mountain Cluster
Mount Rogers Cluster 
Clinch Ranger District Cluster

References

Further reading
 Stephenson, Steven L., A Natural History of the Central Appalachians, 2013, West Virginia University Press, West Virginia, .
 Davis, Donald Edward, Where There Are Mountains, An Environmental History of the Southern Appalachians, 2000, University of Georgia Press, Athens, Georgia. .

External links
 George Washington and Jefferson National Forests
 Wilderness Society
 Geology of Virginia

Protected areas of Virginia